Semri Harchand is a town located on SH 22 between Narmadapuram and Pipariya. Its Pincode is 461668. It comes in Narmadapuram district in the Indian state of Madhya Pradesh.

Villages in Narmadapuram district